Henry Shoaf Farm was a historic farm complex located near Lexington, Davidson County, North Carolina. The complex included a two-story log house with an Italianate style addition built about 1860, double pen log barn dated to 1811, smokehouse, corn crib, granary, and potato house. It has been demolished.

It was added to the National Register of Historic Places in 1984.

References

Log houses in the United States
Farms on the National Register of Historic Places in North Carolina
Italianate architecture in North Carolina
Commercial buildings completed in 1811
Houses in Davidson County, North Carolina
National Register of Historic Places in Davidson County, North Carolina
Log buildings and structures on the National Register of Historic Places in North Carolina